Partido Verde is a Spanish or Portuguese language term meaning "green party" and may refer to one of the following political parties:
Green Party (Brazil)
Partido Verde Ecologista de México (Ecologist Green Party of Mexico)
Partido Verde Oxígeno (Oxygen Green Party) of Columbia
 Partido Verde Colombiano (Colombian Green Party)
Partido Verde Ecologista de Nicaragua (Ecologist Green Party of Nicaragua)
Partido Verde de los Estados Unidos (Green Party of the United States)
One of many other Green parties